The Midwest Political Science Association (MPSA) is a professional association of political science scholars and students in the United States. It was founded in 1939, and publishes the American Journal of Political Science in conjunction with Rice University.

In April of each year, the MPSA holds one of the largest political science conferences in the United States. In 2013, more than 5,700 presenters presented almost 4,700 papers at the conference. Traditionally, the MPSA Conference is held in Chicago, Illinois at the historic Palmer House Hilton.

Presidents 
The presidents of the Midwest Political Science Association have been:
 James K. Pollock, University of Michigan, 1939
 W.H.C. Laves, University of Chicago, 1940
 Francis G. Wilson, University of Illinois, 1941
 John E. Briggs, University of Iowa, 1942
 Howard White, Miami University, 1943–47
 Harold Zink, DePauw University, 1948
 Llewellyn Pfankuchen, University of Wisconsin, 1949
 Harold M. Door, University of Michigan, 1950
 Charles M. Kneier, University of Illinois, 1951
 Harold M. Vinacke, University of Cincinnati, 1952
 Kirk H. Porter, University of Iowa, 1953
 Harry W. Voltmer, DePauw University, 1954
 Asher Christensen, University of Minnesota, 1955
 Edward Buehrig, Indiana University, 1955 (Acting President)
 David Fellman, University of Wisconsin, 1956
 Wilfred E. Binkley, Ohio Northern University, 1957
 Clarence A. Berdahl, University of Illinois, 1958
 Jasper B. Shannon, University of Nebraska, 1959
 Amry Vandenbosch, University of Kentucky, 1960
 Lloyd M. Short, University of Minnesota, 1961
 Richard Spencer, Coe College, 1962
 E. Allen Helms, Ohio State University, 1963
 William O. Farber, University of South Dakota, 1964
 John E. Stoner, Indiana University, 1965
 Clara Penniman, University of Wisconsin, 1966
 Vernon Van Dyke, University of Iowa, 1967
 John D. Lewis, Oberlin College, 1968
 Samuel J. Eldersveld, University of Michigan, 1969
 Merle Kling, Washington University in St. Louis, 1970
 John Wahlke, University of Iowa, 1971
 Leon D. Epstein, University of Wisconsin, 1972
 Doris A. Graber, University of Illinois, Chicago Circle, 1973
 Frank Sorauf, University of Minnesota, 1974
 Charles Press, Michigan State University, 1975
 Norton Long, University of Missouri–St. Louis, 1976
 Samuel Krislov, University of Minnesota, 1977
 Robert Salisbury, Washington University, 1978
 John Kessel, Ohio State University, 1979
 Malcolm E. Jewell, University of Kentucky, 1980
 Samuel C. Patterson, University of Iowa, 1981
 Dina Zinnes, University of Illinois, 1982
 Jack Dennis, University of Wisconsin, 1983
 Lucius Barker, Washington University in St. Louis, 1984
 Elinor Ostrom, Indiana University, 1985
 W. Phillips Shivley, University of Minnesota, 1986
 Ada W. Finifter, Michigan State University, 1987
 John W. Kingdon, University of Michigan, 1988
 William Crotty, Northwestern University, 1989
 Richard Watson, University of Missouri, 1990
 Marjorie Randon Hershey, Indiana University, 1991
 Charles O. Jones, University of Wisconsin–Madison, 1992
 Susan Welch, Pennsylvania State University, 1993
 Lee Sigelman, George Washington University, 1994
 John Sprague, Washington University in St. Louis, 1995
 James Stimson, University of Minnesota, 1996
 Arlene Saxonhouse, University of Michigan, 1997
 Harold Spaeth, Michigan State University, 1998
 James L. Gibson, Washington University in St. Louis, 1999
 Milton Lodge, Stony Brook University, 2000
 Robert Huckfeldt, Indiana University, 2001
 Herbert Weisberg, The Ohio State University, 2002
 Lee Epstein, Washington University in St. Louis, 2003
 Virginia Gray, University of North Carolina, 2004
 John Aldrich, Duke University, 2005
 Kenneth J. Meier, Texas A&M University, 2006
 Gregory Caldeira, The Ohio State University, 2007
 Rodney Hero, University of Notre Dame, 2008
 Jeffrey Segal, Stony Brook University, 2009
 Gary Segura, Stanford University, 2010
 Bryan Jones, University of Texas at Austin, 2011
 Nancy Burns, University of Michigan, 2012
 Arthur Lupia, University of Michigan, 2013
 Edward G. Carmines, Indiana University, 2014-2015
 Paula McClain, Duke University, 2015-2016

References

External links

MPSA 2014 Conference Information

Political science organizations
1939 establishments in the United States
Professional associations based in the United States
Political science in the United States
Organizations established in 1939
Midwestern United States